A religious name is a type of given name bestowed for a religious purposes, and which is generally used in such contexts.

Christianity

Catholic Church

Baptismal name
In baptism, Catholics are given a Christian name, which should not be "foreign to Christian sentiment" and is often the name of a saint. In East Asia, in Africa and elsewhere, the baptismal name is distinct from the traditional-style given name. 

Traditionally, Orthodox and Catholic Christians celebrate their name day (i.e., the feast day of their patron saint), rather than their birthday.

Confirmation name
In some countries, it is common to adopt a confirmation name, always the name of a saint, in addition to the baptismal name. The saint whose name is taken is henceforth considered to be a patron saint.

Religious name
In general, religious names are used among the persons of the consecrated life. In most religious institutes, a new member is traditionally either given a religious name or chooses one. This could be either the name of a beatified or a venerable of the church, an honorific title of the Virgin Mary, or even a virtue or something similar. Apart from that, it is possible to keep the baptismal name as a religious name, too. The name is taken usually either upon investiture or on the occasion of taking the first vows, in some communities prior to the entry of a new postulant.

Papal name 
A newly elected pope traditionally takes on a new name, called his regnal name or papal name.

Lutheran Church
In the Lutheran Churches, those who receive the sacrament of baptism are given a Christian name.

Eastern Church

Baptismal name
In the Eastern Orthodox Church and Eastern Catholicism, converts often take a new name at the time of their reception into the church. When deciding on a name for their child, Orthodox parents will often name the child after a saint whose feast day falls on either the day of the child's birth or the day of its baptism.

Monastic name
Orthodox and Eastern catholic monks and nuns are often given a new monastic name at the time of their investiture.

Judaism
Converts to Judaism take a Hebrew name upon conversion.  Born Jews generally have a patronymic Hebrew name which is used for religious purposes; this is frequently different from their legal name, especially when the latter is of gentile or non-Hebrew origin.

Mandaeism
In Mandaeism, a baptismal (zodiacal) or masbuta name, also known as malwasha, is a name given by a priest, as opposed to a legal name. Mandaeans have matronymic Mandaean names which are used in Mandaean rituals. A malwasha is linked with the mother's name and time of birth in order to protect the individual from their zodiac sign which is considered ominous.

Buddhism

All Buddhist denominations also practice this, with newly ordained Sangha members given new Buddhist names by their master or preceptors. Lay Buddhists (Upāsaka and Upāsikā) are also given Buddhist names during their Tisarana ceremony.

Taoism
All Taoist sects have similar practice like Chinese Buddhism, where all newly ordained Taoist priests or monks are given Taoist name related on their sect's lineage. Lay Taoists who participate in the initiation ceremony are also given Taoist name.

Others

Gaudiya Vaishnavism
Members of ISKCON and some other Gaudiya Vaishnava organisations are given a "spiritual name" by their guru upon initiation. This name ends in "Das" or "Dasa" for men and "Dasi" for women (meaning "servant").

Wicca
In Wicca, a craft name is often used.

References

External links
 Name change on religious conversion, UK Deed Poll

Human names
Religious practices